Leptalina is a genus of skippers in the family Hesperiidae. It contains only one species, Leptalina unicolor, which is found in eastern China, Korea, Japan and the Russian Far East (Amur). The habitat consists of humid meadows.

Adults are on wing from June to July.

The larvae feed on various grasses, including Miscanthus sacchariflorus, Setaria and Phragmites species.

References

External links
Natural History Museum Lepidoptera genus database
 images  representing  Leptalina  at  Consortium for the Barcode of Life

Heteropterinae
Monotypic butterfly genera
Hesperiidae genera